Kate Thompson may refer to:

Kate Fanny Thompson, married name of English composer Kate Loder
Kate Thompson (author) (born 1956), who writes for children and adults, author of The New Policeman and Down among the Gods
Kate Thompson (romantic novelist) (born 1959), author of It Means Mischief and Sex, Lies and Fairytales